Şöbiyet is a Turkish dessert similar to baklava. It is stuffed with a cream, which is made from milk and semolina, and also nuts (walnut or pistachio). It has a soft but crusty outside and creamy inside.

See also
List of Turkish desserts
Warbat

References 

Turkish pastries
Turkish words and phrases
Stuffed desserts